The 2006 SCSA Season was the 6th season of United Kingdom-based NASCAR style stock car racing, originally known as ASCAR.

Teams and drivers

Race calendar

All races were held at the Rockingham Motor Speedway in Corby, Northamptonshire.

The season consisted of six meetings of two races each. The grid for the opening race of each meeting was set by a qualifying session with the second race grid being set by the finishing order of the first.

Final points standings

External links

 
 

Stock car racing in the United Kingdom
ASCAR